The Cook Islands national netball team represent the Cook Islands in international netball. In recent years they have finished 1st at the 2019 Pacific Games, 1st at the 2018 Nations Cup in Singapore, 10th at the 2010 Commonwealth Games and 7th at the 2007 World Netball Championships; the Cook Islands did not qualify for the 2011 World Championships in Singapore. The Cook Islands team were ranked as high as 10th in the INF World Rankings at one stage, now currently 14th.

Team
12 member squad for the Pacific Netball Series Tournament in Fiji, June 27–29.

Competitive history

See also
 Netball in the Cook Islands

References

External links
 Official webpage

Netball
National netball teams of Oceania
Netball in the Cook Islands